Caden is a commune in the Morbihan department of Brittany in north-western France.

Demographics
Inhabitants of Caden are called in French Cadenais.

See also
Communes of the Morbihan department

References

External links

Mayors of Morbihan Association 

Communes of Morbihan